The Newfoundland Seamounts are a group of seamounts offshore of Eastern Canada in the northern Atlantic Ocean. Named for the island of Newfoundland, this group of seamounts formed during the Cretaceous period and are poorly studied.

The Newfoundland Seamounts appear to have formed as a result of the North American Plate passing over the Azores hotspot. Scruncheon Seamount in the middle of the chain has given an isotopic date of 97.7 ± 1.5 million years for the Newfoundland Seamounts. This indicates that the Newfoundland Seamounts were volcanically active in the earliest Cenomanian stage.

Seamounts
The Newfoundland Seamounts include:

Dipper Seamount
Screech Seamount
Shredder Seamount
Scruncheon Seamount
Touton Seamount

See also
Volcanism of Canada
Volcanism of Eastern Canada
List of volcanoes in Canada

References

Volcanoes of Newfoundland and Labrador
Seamounts of the Atlantic Ocean
Seamount chains
Seamounts of Canada